U&I is the fourth studio album by electronic music artist Leila, released by Warp in 2012. It features contributions from Mt. Sims.

Critical reception
At Metacritic, which assigns a weighted average score out of 100 to reviews from mainstream critics, the album received an average score of 70% based on 17 reviews, indicating "generally favorable reviews".

Heather Phares of AllMusic gave the album 3.5 stars out of 5, calling it "a set of songs that are as dense and direct as her previous album was elaborate and enveloping." Mischa Pearlman of Clash gave the album an 8 out of 10, saying, "Intense and claustrophobic, it's a surprisingly revelatory record that captures the highs and lows of human experience and existence." Stephane Girard of Resident Advisor gave the album a 4.0 out of 5 and described it as "Leila's most gripping work to date."

Track listing

Personnel
Credits adapted from liner notes.

 Leila – production
 Mt. Sims – vocals (3, 4, 5, 7, 9, 12)

References

External links
 

2012 albums
Leila (music producer) albums
Warp (record label) albums